Nicrophorus pollinctor may refer to:

 Nicrophorus defodiens, misidentified in 1854 by LeConte
 Nicrophorus investigator, misidentified in 1853 by Mannerheim